Elachista griseicornis is a moth of the family Elachistidae. It is found in Ontario, Quebec and Minnesota.

The forewings are unicolorous silky white. The hindwings are grey. The underside of the forewing is dark grey, while the underside of the hindwings is whitish.

References

Moths described in 1932
Moths of North America
griseicornis